Shadi Lal Koul (4 January 1954 – 12 July 2020) was a Kashmiri actor, best known for his comedy roles. He was also famous for his dialogues Begum salal tche  kyazi goye malal,  Gonaye wanye chakha bonaye ,  Chaki pechni rass Yass  poshi ta tass . He began his career in 1974, and has acted in more than Four hundred Kashmiri serials and Kashmiri plays.  His skill and success earned him the informal title of being the "King of Comedy".

Early life

Shadi Lal Koul was born on 4 January 1954  in a Kashmiri family in Chotta Bazar, Srinagar.  His father was a businessman. Shadi lal  was brought up in Chotta Bazar area of Habba Kadal in Srinagar where he learnt the unique style of comedy acting. He was the eldest in the family consisting of one sister and three brothers.

Shadi lal Koul studied in Boys High school R.N Mandir till the 10th grade. He did his graduation from Amar Singh College.After completing his graduation he developed his career in theatre and acting. In 1974, he and Abdul Rahim Kuchay founded Yasmeen Dramatic Club. He also founded Kali Das Theatre with  his friend Dr.Ayash Arif, which is one of the oldest theatre groups of Kashmir.

Career

His first play was Yi Janam Ti Su Janam directed by Jai Kishan Zutshi. The Tassruf play in 1975 bagged him his first best actor award. He also appeared in Tratte Buzun, Laash Ghar, Dastar, Cactus, Guributh, Local Taxes Extra, Ye zanam su zanam, Machama, Tasruff, Out of Date, Zaher, Bi chaddath ni, Zalur, Premnath vs Premnath etc.

In the 1980s, he became a household name through the TV series Shabrang, which appeared from 1981 to 1983. His other hit television serials included Rangan Heund Rang, Cherry Treuch, Ghulam Begum Baadshah, Tijarratuk Aasan Tarikaa, Gaash Innuss Taam , Rustam Gota, Aadam Zaat,  Pagah Sholi Duniya ,Jatti Wanai ,Pazar Yli Mood, Halyan Banan Wukir Thana ,Gash Pholnas Taam ,Trate Buzun, Naav Dar Aab ,Yeli Tohiy Badliv Teli Soocho ,  Wazir-e- Nazar Guzar and Amaar .

He acted in Kashmiri movie Inqalab.

He also acted in two Hindi serials Gul Gulshan Gulfaam and Katha Sagar, which were broadcast on national television.

Personal life
Shadi Lal Koul was married to Lalita Koul in 1980. They have two sons, Ajay  Koul and Vijay Koul and a daughter Shalini Koul. His older son, Ajay Koul, died of cancer at age 18. Shadi Lal Koul was diagnosed with multiple myeloma in 2016 and underwent chemotherapy.

Awards and honours

Death

It was reported in the media on 12 July 2020 that his cancer had relapsed for the second time since 2016 and that he had been hospitalised for six days. He died, in coma, at 2.45am IST at his residence Durga Nagar, Bantalab, Jammu. He was cremated at Bantalab crematorium in Jammu the same day.

References

1954 births
2020 deaths
Deaths from multiple myeloma
People from Srinagar
Male actors from Jammu and Kashmir